A. John "Jock" Hamilton (31 July 1869 in Ayr, Scotland – 30 October 1931 in Keynsham, England) was a Scottish footballer who played as a centre half. He made over 90 Football League appearances and over 120 Southern League appearances in the years before the First World War. He was also trainer at Fulham and manager at Bristol City.

Career
Hamilton played locally for Ayr FC. He moved south to England to Wolverhampton Wanderers where he suffered a serious injury restricting his appearances. Hamilton joined Loughborough and was ever present in their inaugural Football League season. Hamilton had spells with Derby County and Ilkeston Town. Sam Hollis signed Hamilton in summer 1897 for Bristol City prior to their first season as a professional club in the Southern League Hamilton made his debut for Bristol City.
While working for Fulham as assistant trainer, Hamilton was invited to Brazil to coach Club Athletico Paulistano. He visited São Paulo between April and July 1907 and this is apparently the first example of a Brazilian Club officially engaging the services of a trainer from Britain.

Honours
with Bristol City
Southern Football League runners up: 1897–98
Southern Football League runners up: 1898–99

References

1872 births
1931 deaths
Footballers from Ayr
Scottish footballers
Association football defenders
English Football League players
Scottish Football League players
Southern Football League players
Ayr F.C. players
Wolverhampton Wanderers F.C. players
Loughborough F.C. players
Leicester City F.C. players
Wellingborough Town F.C. players
Bristol City F.C. players
Fulham F.C. players
Watford F.C. players
Bristol City F.C. managers
Fulham F.C. managers
Scottish football managers